Armillaria umbrinobrunnea is a species of mushroom in the family Physalacriaceae. This species is found in South America. The species was originally collected in 1952 by Rolf Singer in Argentina, and named as the variety Armillariella montagnei var. umbrinobrunnea.

See also 
 List of Armillaria species

References 

Fungi described in 1956
Fungi of South America
Fungal tree pathogens and diseases
umbrinobrunnea